Tian Wang Bu Xin Dan, also known as Tianwang buxin teapills, is a Chinese classic herbal formula. It is commonly made into Chinese patent medicine.

Variations
There are about 9 common prescription variations using the same name . One such formula is found in Volume 6 of "Revised Fine Formulas for Women" (校注妇人良方 jiào zhù fùrén liáng fāng) by Bi Li-zhai (c. 1529 CE).

The formula was created by Hóng Jī (T: 洪基, S: 洪基). It was published in "Secret Investigations into Obtaining Life" (shè shēng mì pōu, T: 攝生秘剖, S: 摄生秘剖) in 1638. 

There are many variations of the formula proportions. Each maker of Chinese patent medicine changes the proportions of the herbs slightly. Some herbs may be changed also. For example, rén shēn (ginseng root) may be replaced with dǎng shēn ("poor man's ginseng"). The original formula instructed that the pills be coated with zhū shā (朱砂) (Cinnabar), which is banned by the FDA in the US. It is usually omitted entirely from the formulation or replaced with a substitute.

Chinese classic herbal formula

See also
Chinese classic herbal formula
Chinese patent medicine

External links
Biographies of the creators of many Chinese classic herbal formulas

 Traditional Chinese medicine pills